The Second Bank of the United States was the second federally authorized Hamiltonian national bank in the United States. Located in Philadelphia, Pennsylvania, the bank was chartered from February 1816 to January 1836. The bank's formal name, according to section 9 of its charter as passed by Congress, was "The President Directors and Company of the Bank of the United States". While other banks in the US were chartered by and only allowed to have branches in a single state, it was authorized to have branches in multiple states and lend money to the US government.

A private corporation with public duties, the bank handled all fiscal transactions for the U.S. government, and was accountable to Congress and the U.S. Treasury. Twenty percent of its capital was owned by the federal government, the bank's single largest stockholder. Four thousand private investors held 80 percent of the bank's capital, including three thousand Europeans. The bulk of the stocks were held by a few hundred wealthy Americans. In its time, the institution was the largest monied corporation in the world.

The essential function of the bank was to regulate the public credit issued by private banking institutions through the fiscal duties it performed for the U.S. Treasury, and to establish a sound and stable national currency. The federal deposits endowed the bank with its regulatory capacity.

Modeled on Alexander Hamilton's First Bank of the United States, the Second Bank was chartered by President James Madison, who in 1791 had attacked the First Bank as unconstitutional, in 1816 and began operations at its main branch in Philadelphia on January 7, 1817, managing 25 branch offices nationwide by 1832.

The efforts to renew the bank's charter put the institution at the center of the general election of 1832, in which the bank's president Nicholas Biddle and pro-bank National Republicans led by Henry Clay clashed with the "hard-money" Andrew Jackson administration and eastern banking interests in the Bank War. Failing to secure recharter, the Second Bank became a private corporation in 1836, and underwent liquidation in 1841.

History

Establishment 
The political support for the revival of a national banking system was rooted in the early 19th century transformation of the country from simple Jeffersonian agrarianism towards one interdependent with industrialization and finance. In the aftermath of the War of 1812, the federal government suffered from the disarray of an unregulated currency and a lack of fiscal order; business interests sought security for their government bonds. A national alliance arose to legislate a national bank to address these needs.

The political climate—dubbed the Era of Good Feelings—favored the development of national programs and institutions, including a protective tariff, internal improvements and the revival of a Bank of the United States. Southern and western support for a bank, led by Republican nationalists John C. Calhoun of South Carolina and Henry Clay of Kentucky, was decisive in the successful chartering effort. The charter was signed into law by James Madison on April 10, 1816. Subsequent efforts by Calhoun and Clay to earmark the bank's $1.5 million establishment "bonus", and annual dividends estimated at $650,000, as a fund for internal improvements, were vetoed by President Madison, on strict constructionist grounds.

Opposition to a new bank emanated from two interests. Old Republicans, represented by John Taylor of Caroline and John Randolph of Roanoke, characterized the Second Bank as both constitutionally illegitimate and a direct threat to Jeffersonian agrarianism, state sovereignty and the institution of slavery, expressed by Taylor's statement that "...if Congress could incorporate a bank, it might emancipate a slave." Hostile to the regulatory effects of the national bank, private banks—proliferating with or without state charters—had scuttled rechartering of the First Bank in 1811. These interests played significant roles in undermining the institution during the administration of U.S. President Andrew Jackson (1829–1837).

Economic functions 
The Second Bank was a national bank. However, it did not serve the functions of a modern central bank: It did not set monetary policy, regulate private banks, hold their excess reserves, or act as a lender of last resort.

The bank was launched in the midst of a major global market readjustment as Europe recovered from the Napoleonic Wars. It was charged with restraining uninhibited private bank note issue—already in progress—that threatened to create a credit bubble and the risks of a financial collapse. Government land sales in the West, fueled by European demand for agricultural products, ensured that a speculative bubble would form. Simultaneously, the national bank was engaged in promoting a democratized expansion of credit to accommodate laissez-faire impulses among eastern business entrepreneurs and credit-hungry western and southern farmers.

Under the management of its first president William Jones, the bank failed to control paper money issued from its branch banks in the West and South, contributing to the post-war speculative land boom. When the U.S. markets collapsed in the Panic of 1819—a result of global economic adjustments—the bank came under withering criticism for its belated tight money policies—policies that exacerbated mass unemployment and plunging property values. Further, it transpired that branch directors for the Baltimore office had engaged in fraud and larceny.

Resigning in January 1819, Jones was replaced by Langdon Cheves, who continued the contraction in credit in an effort to stop inflation and stabilize the bank, even as the economy began to correct. The bank's reaction to the crisis—a clumsy expansion, then a sharp contraction of credit—indicated its weakness, not its strength. The effects were catastrophic, resulting in a protracted recession with mass unemployment and a sharp drop in property values that persisted until 1822. The financial crisis raised doubts among the American public as to the efficacy of paper money, and in whose interests a national system of finance operated. Upon this widespread disaffection the anti-bank Jacksonian Democrats would mobilize opposition to the bank in the 1830s. The bank was in general disrepute among most Americans when Nicholas Biddle, the third and last president of the bank, was appointed by President James Monroe in 1823.

Under Biddle's guidance, the bank evolved into a powerful institution that produced a strong and sound system of national credit and currency. From 1823 to 1833, Biddle expanded credit steadily, but with restraint, in a manner that served the needs of the expanding American economy. Albert Gallatin, former Secretary of the Treasury under Thomas Jefferson and James Madison, wrote in 1831 that the bank was fulfilling its charter expectations.

Jackson's Bank War 

By the time of Jackson's inauguration in 1829, the bank appeared to be on solid footing. The Supreme Court had affirmed its constitutionality in McCulloch v. Maryland, the 1819 case which Daniel Webster had argued successfully on its behalf a decade earlier, the Treasury recognized the useful services it provided, and the American currency was healthy and stable. Public perceptions of the national bank were generally positive. The bank first came under attack by the Jackson administration in December 1829, on the grounds that it had failed to produce a stable national currency, and that it lacked constitutional legitimacy. Both houses of Congress responded with committee investigations and reports affirming the historical precedents for the bank's constitutionality and its pivotal role in furnishing a uniform currency. Jackson rejected these findings, and privately characterized the bank as a corrupt institution, dangerous to American liberties.

Biddle made repeated overtures to Jackson and his cabinet to secure a compromise on the bank's rechartering (its term due to expire in 1836) without success. Jackson and the anti-bank forces persisted in their condemnation of the bank, provoking an early recharter campaign by pro-bank National Republicans under Henry Clay. Clay's political ultimatum to Jackson—with Biddle's financial and political support—sparked the Bank War and placed the fate of the bank at center of the 1832 presidential election.

Jackson mobilized his political base by vetoing the recharter bill and, the veto sustained, easily won reelection on his anti-bank platform. Jackson proceeded to destroy the bank as a financial and political force by removing its federal deposits, and in 1833, federal revenue was diverted into selected private banks by executive order, ending the regulatory role of the Second Bank.

In hopes of extorting a rescue of the bank, Biddle induced a short-lived financial crisis that was initially blamed on Jackson's executive action. By 1834, a general backlash against Biddle's tactics developed, ending the panic, and all recharter efforts were abandoned.

State bank 
In February 1836, the bank became a private corporation under Pennsylvania law. A shortage of hard currency ensued, causing the Panic of 1837 and lasting approximately seven years. The bank suspended payment from October 1839 to January 1841, and permanently in February 1841. It then started a lengthy liquidation process, complicated by lawsuits, that ended in 1852 when it assigned its remaining assets to trustees and surrendered the state charter.

Branches 
The bank maintained the following branches. Listed is the year each branch opened.

 Augusta, Georgia (1817, closed 1817)
 Baltimore, Maryland (1817)
 Boston, Massachusetts (1817)
 Charleston, South Carolina (1817)
 Chillicothe, Ohio (1817)
 Cincinnati, Ohio (1817)
 Fayetteville, North Carolina (1817)
 Lexington, Kentucky (1817)
 Louisville, Kentucky (1817)

 Middletown, Connecticut (1817)
 New Orleans, Louisiana (1817)
 New York City, New York (1817)
 Norfolk, Virginia (1817)
 Portsmouth, New Hampshire (1817)
 Providence, Rhode Island (1817)
 Richmond, Virginia (1817)
 Savannah, Georgia (1817)
 Washington, D.C. (1817)

 Mobile, Alabama (1826)
 Nashville, Tennessee (1827)
 Portland, Maine (1828)
 Buffalo, New York (1829)
 St. Louis, Missouri (1829)
 Burlington, Vermont (1830)
 Utica, New York (1830)
 Natchez, Mississippi (1830)

Presidents 

 William Jones, January 7, 1817 – January 25, 1819
 James Fisher, January 25, 1819 – March 6, 1819 
 Langdon Cheves, March 6, 1819 – January 6, 1823
 Nicholas Biddle, January 6, 1823 – March 1839
 Thomas Dunlap, March 1839 – February 1841
 William Drayton, 1841
 James Robertson, 1841 – March 22, 1852

Terms of charter 
The Second Bank was America's national bank, comparable to the Bank of England and the Bank of France, with one key distinction – the United States government owned one-fifth (20 percent) of its capital. Whereas other national banks of that era were wholly private, the Second Bank was more characteristic of a government bank.

Under its charter, the bank had a capital limit of $35 million, $7.5 million of which represented the government-owned share. It was required to remit a "bonus" payment of $1.5 million, payable in three installments, to the government for the privilege of using the public funds, interest free, in its private banking ventures. The institution was answerable for its performance to the U.S. Treasury and Congress and subject to Treasury Department inspection.

As exclusive fiscal agent for the federal government, it provided a number of services as part of its charter, including holding and transfer of all U.S. deposits, payment and receipt of all government transactions, and processing of tax payments. In other words, the bank was "the depository of the federal government, which was its principal stockholder and customer."

The chief personnel for the bank comprised 25 directors, five of whom were appointed by the President of the United States, subject to Senate approval. Federally appointed directors were barred from acting as officials in other banks. Two of the three Bank presidents, William Jones and Nicholas Biddle, were chosen from among these government directors.

Headquartered in Philadelphia, the bank was authorized to establish branch offices where it deemed suitable, and these were immune from state taxation.

Regulatory mechanisms 
The primary regulatory task of the Second Bank, as chartered by Congress in 1816, was to restrain the uninhibited proliferation of paper money (bank notes) by state or private lenders, which was highly profitable to these institutions. In this capacity, the bank would preside over this democratization of credit, contributing to a vast and profitable disbursement of bank loans to farmers, small manufacturers and entrepreneurs, encouraging rapid and healthy economic expansion. Historian Bray Hammond describes the mechanism by which the bank exerted its anti-inflationary influence:

Under this banking regime, the impulse towards over-speculation, with the risks of creating a national financial crisis, would be avoided, or at least mitigated. It was just this mechanism that the local private banks found objectionable, because it yoked their lending strategies to the fiscal operations of the national government, requiring them to maintain adequate gold and silver reserves to meet their debt obligations to the U.S. Treasury. The proliferation of private-sector banking institutions – from 31 banks in 1801 to 788 in 1837 – meant that the Second Bank faced strong opposition from this sector during the Jackson administration.

Architecture 

The architect of the Second Bank was William Strickland (1788–1854), a former student of Benjamin Latrobe (1764–1820), the man who is often called the first professionally trained American architect. Latrobe and Strickland were both disciples of the Greek Revival style. Strickland went on to design many other American public buildings in this style, including financial structures such as the Mechanics National Bank (also in Philadelphia). He also designed the second building for the main U.S. Mint in Philadelphia in 1833, as well as the New Orleans, Dahlonega, and Charlotte branch mints in the mid-to-late 1830s.

Strickland's design for the Second Bank is in essence based on the Parthenon in Athens, and is a significant early and monumental example of Greek Revival architecture. The hallmarks of the Greek Revival style can be seen immediately in the north and south façades, which use a large set of steps leading up to the main level platform, known as the stylobate. On top of these, Strickland placed eight severe Doric columns, which are crowned by an entablature containing a triglyph frieze and simple triangular pediment. The building appears much as an ancient Greek temple, hence the stylistic name. The interior consists of an entrance hallway in the center of the north façade flanked by two rooms on either side. The entry leads into two central rooms, one after the other, that span the width of the structure east to west. The east and west sides of the first large room are each pierced by a large arched fan window. The building's exterior uses Pennsylvania blue marble, which, due to the manner in which it was cut, has begun to deteriorate due to weak parts of the stone being exposed to the elements. This phenomenon is most visible on the Doric columns of the south façade.  Construction lasted from 1819 to 1824.

The Greek Revival style used for the Second Bank contrasts with the earlier, Federal style in architecture used for the First Bank of the United States, which also still stands and is located nearby in Philadelphia. This can be seen in the more Roman-influenced Federal structure's ornate, colossal Corinthian columns of its façade, which is also embellished by Corinthian pilasters and a symmetric arrangement of sash windows piercing the two stories of the façade. The roofline is also topped by a balustrade, and the heavy modillions adorning the pediment give the First Bank an appearance much more like a Roman villa than a Greek temple.

Current building use 
Since the bank's closing in 1841, the edifice has performed a variety of functions. Today, it is part of Independence National Historical Park in Philadelphia. The structure is open to the public free of charge and serves as an art gallery, housing a large collection of portraits of prominent early Americans painted by Charles Willson Peale and many others.

The building was designated a National Historic Landmark in 1987 for its architectural and historic significance.

The Wall Street branch in New York City was converted into the United States Assay Office before it was demolished in 1915. The federal-style façade was saved and installed in the American Wing of the Metropolitan Museum of Art in 1924.

In popular culture 
The Second Bank building was described by Charles Dickens in a chapter of his 1842 travelogue American Notes for General Circulation, Philadelphia, and its solitary prison: We reached the city, late that night. Looking out of my chamber-window, before going to bed, I saw, on the opposite side of the way, a handsome building of white marble, which had a mournful ghost-like aspect, dreary to behold.  I attributed this to the sombre influence of the night, and on rising in the morning looked out again, expecting to see its steps and portico thronged with groups of people passing in and out. The door was still tight shut, however; the same cold cheerless air prevailed: and the building looked as if the marble statue of Don Guzman could alone have any business to transact within its gloomy walls. I hastened to inquire its name and purpose, and then my surprise vanished. It was the Tomb of many fortunes; the Great Catacomb of investment; the memorable United States Bank.

The stoppage of this bank, with all its ruinous consequences, had cast (as I was told on every side) a gloom on Philadelphia, under the depressing effect of which it yet laboured. It certainly did seem rather dull and out of spirits.

See also 

 Banking in the Jacksonian Era
 Federal Reserve
 Federal Reserve Act
 First Bank of the United States
 History of central banking in the United States
 McCulloch v. Maryland
 Panic of 1837
 List of National Historic Landmarks in Philadelphia
 National Register of Historic Places listings in Center City, Philadelphia

Notes

References

Bibliography 

 
  online review
 
 
 
 
 
 Feller, Daniel. "The Bank War", in Julian E. Zelizer, ed. The American Congress (2004), pp 93–111.
 .
 
 
 
 
 
 
 
 
 Kahan, Paul. The Bank War: Andrew Jackson, Nicholas Biddle, and the Fight for American Finance (Yardley: Westholme, 2016. xii, 187 pp.
 
  online review
 
 
 
 
 
 
 
 
 Ratner, Sidney, James H. Soltow, and Richard Sylla. The Evolution of the American Economy: Growth, Welfare, and Decision Making. (1993)
 
 
 
 
  
 Schweikart, Larry. Banking in the American South from the Age of Jackson to Reconstruction (1987)
 Taylor; George Rogers, ed. Jackson Versus Biddle: The Struggle over the Second Bank of the United States (1949).
 Temin, Peter. The Jacksonian Economy (1969)

External links 

 Second Bank – official site at Independence Hall National Historical Park
 Documents produced by the Second Bank of the United States on FRASER
 Andrew Jackson on the Web : Bank of the United States
 

Bank buildings in Philadelphia
Art museums and galleries in Philadelphia
Buildings and structures in Independence National Historical Park
Museums in Philadelphia
Banks based in Philadelphia
Defunct banks of the United States
Former central banks
Commercial buildings completed in 1824
Bank buildings on the National Register of Historic Places in Philadelphia
National Historic Landmarks in Pennsylvania
Presidency of Andrew Jackson
Presidency of James Madison
14th United States Congress
Banks established in 1816
Banks disestablished in 1841
1816 establishments in Massachusetts
Defunct companies based in Pennsylvania
Financial history of the United States
Independence National Historical Park
Historic American Buildings Survey in Philadelphia
1820s architecture in the United States
Greek Revival architecture in Pennsylvania
Neoclassical architecture in Pennsylvania
American companies disestablished in 1841